NationsBank Plaza is the former name of:

 Bank of America Plaza (Atlanta), Georgia
 Bank of America Plaza (Charlotte), North Carolina
 Bank of America Plaza (Dallas), Texas